The World Poker Open was one of the annual events on the World Poker Tour.

Notes 

World Poker Tour